Mammillaria fraileana is one of about 200 species of the genus Mammillaria from the cactus family Cactaceae.  This species is native to Mexico and can be found along the east coast of the southern part of Baja California Peninsula in Desert Scrub communities. They tend to grow in non-calcareous dry granite-based soil but can also grow in rocky habitats, either in rock fissures or directly on top of the rock surface even without the presence of soil. Thus, the mineral composition of the rocks in their habitat directly influence their abundance. The habitat of Mammillaria fraileana is home to succulent flora and is particularly rich in local endemics.  Currently, no major threats to the species are known to exist.

Description
The genus Mammillaria is known to have specific features such as an areole separated into two parts: the apex of the tubercle and the base.  The apex bears the spine of the cactus, while the base bears flowers and fruits.

Specifically, Mammillaria fraileana has its own traits. These cacti grow in slowly offsetting, irregularly forming clusters, large and small. They have cylindrical stems, usually 3–4 cm in diameter, in the clump near the base. Their body is green, but can come off reddish if grown in full light. Tubercles are pyramidal without latex. Roots are fibrous. This cactus has 11 to 12 thin and white radial spines that range from 8 to 10 mm long. Their 3 to 4 central spines are dark brown and are commonly 10 mm long. Mammillaria fraileana grow light pink flowers with a darker pink median line. These flowers are 2.5 to 3 cm in diameter, and their stigma is bright pink. The fruit is red and contains small black seeds. Mammillaria fraileana commonly bloom from May to September.

Cultivation
Mammillaria fraileana is not known for being easy to cultivate, however in good conditions with ventilation it can grow easily. Since this species thrives in an arid climate, they are especially sensitive to overwatering and require open potting soil with sufficient air. The mix must be moderately acidic. Peat and other humus sources in the soil can be detrimental to growth, along with limestone. Mammillaria fraileana needs maximum sunlight to grow and achieve success in flowering, as they are used to warmer climates. Likewise, frost can harm the plant as well. Letting the plant rest in winter to shrivel, even losing up to 25% of its summer height, will help the flowering process.

Rock weathering
Studies have shown that Mammillaria fraileana is a pioneer cactus in rock-colonizing. These cacti grow in rocky habitats, many including rhyodacite rocks. Evidence has shown that rhyodacite is weathered to greater extents while in the presence of these cacti, which supports the argument that this species is directly associated with rock weathering and thus, the formation of soil. This small cactus does this through processes like nitrogen fixation that take place in the endophytic bacteria that lives in inside the cactus and on its roots. Studies have found large populations of culturable endophytic bacteria in stems and roots of many wild colonizing rock plants in the southern Sonoran Desert, but not in the seeds. However, there are more studies that are showing endophytic bacteria living in the fruits of some Sonoran Desert cacti.

References

fraileana
Cacti of Mexico